

Denmark
South Greenland – Carl Peter Holbøll, Inspector of South Greenland (1828–1856)

France
 Algeria – Thomas Robert Bugeaud, Governor-General of Algeria (1841–1847)
 Oceania – Armand Joseph Bruat, Governor of the Colony of Oceania (1843–1847)

Portugal
Angola –
 Lorenço Germack Possolo, Governor-General of Angola (1844–1845)
 Pedro Soto, Governor-General of Angola (1845–1848)

United Kingdom
 Malta Colony – Patrick Stuart, Governor of Malta (1843–1847)
 New South Wales – Major George Gipps, Governor of New South Wales (1838–1846)
 South Australia  
 Sir George Grey, Governor of South Australia (1841–1845)
 Lieutenant-Colonel Frederick Holt Robe, Governor of South Australia (1845–1848)
 Western Australia – John Hutt, Governor of Western Australia (1839–1846)

Colonial governors
Colonial governors
1845